Abdul Rauf Khalid (19 December 1957 in Peshawar – 24 November 2011) was a Pakistani actor, filmmaker and television writer/director.

Early life and career
Rauf Khalid, while he was still a college student, began writing for Radio Pakistan.

An ex-serviceman and bureaucrat, he worked in films and television plays after attending Islamia College University, Peshawar. In 1989, he wrote and partially directed Madaar, a seven-episode serial exposing drug trafficking, telecast from Pakistan Television Corporation (PTV) - Quetta Center.

In 1991, he wrote Guest House (TV series), a 52-episode comedy series.

In 1995, Rauf Khalid directed Angar Wadi, a 15-episode serial for which he was an actor and a producer apart from writing it. In 1998, Khalid made Laag, a 27-episodes serial (he wrote, directed, produced and acted in it). In 2003, Rauf Khalid released Laaj, his debut film. Although it reportedly did poorly at the box office, it won 12 Bolan Awards, 14 Graduate Awards, 4 National Film Awards and the Lux Style Awards.

In 2007, Rauf Khalid established a College of TV and Film Direction in Lok Virsa, Shakarparian, Islamabad. He was the chairman of the National Institute of Cultural Studies, Islamabad. In 2008, Khalid made his third television serial (Mishaal), for which he served as writer, director and producer, which was telecast by National TV network PTV Home on Tuesday evenings in Pakistan.

Art
His paintings have been exhibited in the World Fine Art Gallery, New York City and the Omma Art Gallery in Crete, Greece.

TV Dramas
Rozgaar (a PTV show)
Laag (1998) (a PTV show)
Guest House (a PTV show)
Angar Wadi (1995) (a PTV show)
Mishaal (2008) (a PTV show)

Personal life
He was married to the Pakistani senator Rubina Khalid.

Death and legacy
Rauf Khalid died on 24 November 2011, aged 53, in a traffic accident near Sheikhupura as he was coming to Islamabad from Lahore via the M-2 motorway. Among the survivors are his wife Rubina Khalid, two sons and a daughter. His funeral prayer was offered in Peshawar, Khyber Pakhtunkhwa.

In March 2012, an event was arranged by Lok Virsa of Pakistan to pay tribute to him which was attended by Minister for Communications Arbab Alamgir Khan, senators Saeeda Iqbal and Saifullah Bangash.

Awards

See also 
 List of Pakistani actors

References

External links
 
 Laaj (Archived film profile)
 Notice of death of Rauf Khalid (Archived)

1957 births
2011 deaths
Pakistani dramatists and playwrights
Pakistani male television actors
Pakistani television writers
Pakistani male film actors
Pakistani film directors
Pakistani film producers
Recipients of the Pride of Performance
Road incident deaths in Pakistan
Pakistani television directors
Pakistani television producers
Pashtun people
Male television writers